Kiko World Football (also known as Puma World Football and World Football 98) is a football simulation game developed and published by Ubi Soft for PC. It was released in 1998, just before 1998 Football World Cup.

It featured Kiko Narváez, Spain national team striker.

Trivia 

The game was later distributed as a gift when buying Danone yogurts under the name of Danone World Football.
 It was an ad-game, as in the break between halves an advertisement was shown.

Other names for the game when distributed as budget label were World Football, Sean Dundee's World Club Football and Kiko World Football '98.

References

External links 
 CD cover
 1998 DANONE ADVERTISING (Danone World Football and the first DAN UP ad)
 World football 98
 Puma
 Puma-named game review
 

Association football video games
DOS games
1998 video games
Ubisoft games
Video games developed in France
Windows games